The Turner Tomorrow Fellowship Award was created in 1989 by Ted Turner, to be awarded to an unpublished work of fiction offering creative and positive solutions to global problems.   Ishmael by Daniel Quinn won the award in 1991, which will not be awarded again, and was selected out of 2500 entries by a celebrity panel including famous sci-fi writer Ray Bradbury.  The award was worth $500,000, the largest single sum ever awarded to a single work of literature.

Turner created the prize in hopes of combining literary merit with potential solutions to near-term environmental concerns. While unveiling the award he said, "The great minds of today need to focus on the problems of global significance if humanity is to see new tomorrows" adding, "These awards are designed to encourage writing by authors throughout the world and in all languages that creates positive solutions to global problems."

In addition to a $500,000 award, the fellowship included a hardcover publishing contract with Turner Broadcasting's publishing unit and $50,000 to market the book and a film option. Three awards of merit were also presented, which included $50,000, a publishing contract and film option, to Sara Cameron for her novel "Natural Enemies", Janet Keller for "Necessary Risks" and Andy Goldblatt for "The Bully Pulpit."

In addition to Ray Bradbury, the judges included: Nobel Laureate for Literature Nadine Gordimer, novelists Wallace Stegner, Peter Matthiessen, William Styron and Rodney Hall as well as Betty and Ian Ballantine, founders of Ballantine Books. Thomas H. Guinzburg, former president of Viking Press and one of the founders of the Paris Review, was the managing director.

Controversy 
Some of the judges, including novelists William Styron, Peter Matthiessen and Wallace Stegner, felt while Ishmael was the best of the 12 manuscripts,  "we didn't feel it was worth anything remotely like $500,000." They felt that Michael Reagan, of Turner Publishing, had handled their grievances dishonestly. Ray Bradbury disagreed with his fellow judges: "This is a fine piece of work... If Kitty Kelley can make $5-million-to-$6 million, why not half-a-million for a real book?" $10,000 was paid to each of the nine judges.

References 

American fiction awards